Gili Liel Haimovitz (גילי חיימוביץ; born February 24, 1993) is an Israeli taekwondo fighter. In 2009 he won the gold medal in the -45 kg category at the European Taekwondo Junior Championships, and at the 2010 Youth Olympic Games he won a gold medal in the under-48-kilogram event.

Taekwando career
Haimovitz began practicing taekwando as a child. He joined the Israeli Defense Forces in 2011, leading to him missing a number of competitions. He grew up practicing at the Sharabi Martial Arts Club. He is coached by Yechiam Sharabi and Mark Breginski. 

In 2009 he won the gold medal in the -45 kg category at the European Taekwondo Junior Championships in Trelleborg, Sweden.

At the 2010 Youth Olympic Games he won a gold medal in the under-48-kilogram, or 106-pound, event at 17 years of age.

In 2012 he won gold medals in -45 kg youth at the Trelleborg Open and the Israel Open, in 2015 he won gold medals in -54 kg senior at the Israel Open and the Serbia Open, and in 2016 he won a gold medal in -54 kg senior at the Slovenia Open.  He won a bronze medal at the 2016 European Championships in Grozny (U21; -58 kg), and a bronze medal at the 2019 Multi European Games in Sofia (senior; -68 kg).

References

External links
 

1993 births
Living people
Israeli male taekwondo practitioners
Taekwondo practitioners at the 2010 Summer Youth Olympics
Youth Olympic gold medalists for Israel
Taekwondo practitioners at the 2015 European Games
European Games competitors for Israel